Nuria Llagostera Vives and María José Martínez Sánchez were the defending champions, but  decided not to participate together.
Llagostera Vives partnered up with Anastasia Rodionova, but they lost to Daniela Hantuchová and Agnieszka Radwańska in the first round.
Martínez Sánchez played alongside Liezel Huber and they ended up winning in the final against Květa Peschke and Katarina Srebotnik 7–6(5), 6–3.

Seeds
The top four seeds receive a bye into the second round.

Draw

Finals

Top half

Bottom half

External links
Doubles Draw

Dubai Tennis Championships - Women's Doubles
2011 Dubai Tennis Championships